Inglewood is a house to the north-west of the village of Ledsham, Cheshire, England.  It was built in 1909, but is dated 1915.  The house was built for Frederick H. Fox, a Liverpool millionaire who made his fortune in marine insurance.  It was later one of the seats of the Gordon family. As of 2011 it is a hotel called Inglewood Manor Hotel.  The house is mainly half-timbered, with stone dressings, and brick chimneys decorated with diapering.  It is roofed with Lakeland slate.  Its architectural style is late Arts and Crafts.  The house has a rectangular plan, with three fronts in two and three storeys.  The entrance is on the east front, which has eight bays; the south and west fronts each have five bays.  On the south side is a balcony overlooking the gardens.  The house is recorded in the National Heritage List for England as a designated Grade II listed building.  Also listed Grade II are the south and west terrace walls of the garden, and the east terrace walls and a pergola.

See also

Listed buildings in Ledsham, Cheshire

References

Country houses in Cheshire
Hotels in Cheshire
Houses completed in 1909
Arts and Crafts architecture in England
Grade II listed buildings in Cheshire
Grade II listed houses
Country house hotels